Petvar Heights are the heights rising to 2492 m at Mount Mullen in southeast Sentinel Range, Ellsworth Mountains in Antarctica.  The heights occupy an oval shaped area with a diameter of 21 km, separated from the rest of Sentinel Range by Wessbecher Glacier to the southwest, Kasilag Pass to the west, and Kornicker Glacier to the northwest and north. Their interior is drained by Hudman, Carey, Razboyna, Gabare and Divdyadovo Glaciers.

The heights are named after the settlement of Petvar in Southern Bulgaria.

Location
US mapping in 1961, updated in 1988.

Maps
 Vinson Massif.  Scale 1:250 000 topographic map.  Reston, Virginia: US Geological Survey, 1988.
 Antarctic Digital Database (ADD). Scale 1:250000 topographic map of Antarctica. Scientific Committee on Antarctic Research (SCAR). Since 1993, regularly updated.

See also
 Mountains in Antarctica

Geographical features include:

 Bagra Peak
 Carey Glacier
 Divdyadovo Glacier
 Fruzhin Peak
 Gabare Glacier
 Hudman Glacier
 Kasilag Pass
 Kornicker Glacier
 Long Peak
 Malkoch Peak
 Marze Peak
 Miller Peak
 Mount Landolt
 Mount Mullen
 Mountainview Ridge
 Razboyna Glacier
 Ruset Peak
 Thomas Glacier
 Wessbecher Glacier

Notes

References
 Petvar Heights. SCAR Composite Antarctic Gazetteer
 Bulgarian Antarctic Gazetteer. Antarctic Place-names Commission (in Bulgarian)
 Basic data (in English)

External links
 Petvar Heights. Copernix satellite image

Mountains of Ellsworth Land
Bulgaria and the Antarctic